The Inventor is a 1981 Swiss-German comedy drama directed by Kurt Gloor. It was entered into the 31st Berlin International Film Festival.

Cast
 Bruno Ganz – Jakob Nüssli
 Walo Lüönd – Otti
 Verena Peter – Martha Nüssli
 Oliver Diggelmann – Seppli Nüssli
 Klaus Knuth – Philipp Nüssli
 Thomas Ott – Kobi
 Babett Arens – Lisbeth
 Inigo Gallo – Victor
 Erwin Kohlund – Fabrikant (Facrory-owner)
 Klaus Steiger – Arzt (Doktor)
 Walter Ruch – Pfarrer (Reverend)
 Mathias Gnädinger – Spekulant (Speculator)
 Ettore Cella – Patron

References

External links

1981 films
1981 comedy films
1981 drama films
1981 comedy-drama films
Swiss comedy-drama films
German comedy-drama films
West German films
1980s German-language films
Films directed by Kurt Gloor
Films set in the 1910s
Films set in Switzerland
Tragicomedy films
1980s German films